George Kocherry (born 4 February 1945) is an Indian prelate of the Syro-Malabar Church who joined the diplomatic service of the Holy See in 1978 and became an archbishop and nuncio in 2000. After serving as apostolic nuncio to Togo, Ghana, and Zimbabwe, he was the nuncio to Bangladesh from 2013 to 2022.

Biography
George Kocherry was born in Changanacherry, Kerala, on 4 February 1945, the eldest of fourteen children.

He left India in 1967 to study philosophy and theology in Rome, where he obtained his doctorate in canon law. He was ordained a priest of the Archeparchy of Changanacherry on 26 June 1974.

To prepare for the diplomatic service, he completed the course of study at the Pontifical Ecclesiastical Academy in 1974.

He entered the diplomatic service of the Holy See on 1 May 1978. He served in the nunciatures in South Korea, Costa Rica, Nigeria, Trinidad and Tobago, Thailand, Singapore, Switzerland and Australia.

On 10 June 2000, Pope John Paul II appointed him Apostolic Nuncio to Ghana and Togo and Titular Archbishop of Othona. He received his episcopal consecration from Archbishop Joseph Powathil on 21 August. As a rare nuncio not raised in the Roman rite, he said: "By my appointment, the Vatican has declared its love and consideration for the Syro-Malabar archdiocese."

He was replaced as nuncio to Togo in November 2002, when Pierre Nguyên Van Tot received that title along with that of nuncio to Benin.

On 22 December 2007, Pope Benedict XVI named him Apostolic Nuncio to Zimbabwe.

On 6 July 2013, Pope Francis appointed him Apostolic Nuncio to Bangladesh. He held that position when Pope Francis visited Bangladesh in November 2017 and he coordinate later efforts to support Rohingya refugees.

Pope Francis accepted his resignation from his Bangladesh assignment on 24 August 2022.

See also
 List of heads of the diplomatic missions of the Holy See

References

1945 births
Living people
Apostolic Nuncios to Zimbabwe
Apostolic Nuncios to Togo
Apostolic Nuncios to Ghana
Apostolic Nuncios to Bangladesh
Syro-Malabar Catholics
People from Changanassery
Christian clergy from Kerala
Indian Roman Catholics
Roman Catholic titular archbishops
21st-century Eastern Catholic archbishops